LPGA International is a golf club located in Daytona Beach, Volusia County, Florida, United States, and the main golf facility used by the Ladies Professional Golf Association (LPGA). The golf facilities are owned by the City of Daytona Beach and operated under agreement with the LPGA. The golf club offers two 18-hole courses, Champions and Legends. In 2013, these were renamed to the Jones and Hills courses, reflecting the architects who designed them.

Overview
In addition to the two Bermuda grass golf courses, the facility offers a driving range, practice putting green, and full-service restaurant. The complex is owned and operated by Fore Golf Partners.

History
When the Ladies Professional Golf Association was looking for a new headquarters in the late 1980s, the City of Daytona Beach made an effort to attract them to this city. Daytona Beach renamed Eleventh Street to LPGA Boulevard and offered to build a new golf course for the LPGA on undeveloped land near the western border of the city. Consolidated Tomoka Land Company agreed to donate 650 acres of land to the City, and the result was LPGA International.

The venue has hosted the Mercury Titleholders Championship from 1995 to 2000, Arch Wireless Championship in 2000, several editions of the Symetra Tour Championship, the LPGA Tour Final Qualifying Tournament, and the 2001 and 2007 NCAA Division I Women's Golf Championships.

The Courses

Jones Course
Rees Jones designed the Jones Course, which opened in 1994 and is a favorite of tour players. It offers traditional links style golf design, totaling 7,088 yards. It poses a challenge with strategic mounding, sand bunkers, natural marsh areas, beautiful lakes and undulating greens.

The Jones course has been rated as four and a half stars (out of five) on average by Golf Digest magazine readers. GolfLink.com users have rated the Champion course at four stars (out of five) overall. In its 2013 ranking of America's Top 50 Golf Courses for Women, Golf Digest ranked the Champions Course seventh. 

|}

Hills Course
Arthur Hills designed the Hills Course, which opened in 1998 and offers a design of 6,984 yards. The course features natural wetlands, narrow pine corridors, small greens and strategically placed water hazards. The Hills course is considered to be the more challenging of the two.

The Hills course has been rated as four and a half stars (out of five) on average by Golf Digest magazine readers. GolfLink.com users have rated the Legends course at three stars (out of five) overall.

|}

References

External links

 Official website
 ClubCorp

Golf clubs and courses in Volusia County, Florida
Golf clubs and courses in Florida
Golf clubs and courses designed by Rees Jones
Buildings and structures in Daytona Beach, Florida
Sports in Daytona Beach, Florida
1994 establishments in Florida